Manuela Brütsch (born 14 February 1984) is a Swiss female handballer for HSG Bad Wildungen in the Frauen Handball-Bundesliga and the Swiss national team. 

Brütsch made her official debut on the Swiss national team on 27 November 2004, against Portugal. She represented Switzerland for the first time at the 2022 European Women's Handball Championship in Slovenia, Montenegro and North Macedonia.

Achievements
 SPAR Premium League
Winner: 2007, 2008, 2009, 2011
 Swiss Women's Cup
Winner: 2008, 2009, 2010
Finalist: 2011

References

External links

1984 births
Living people
Swiss female handball players
21st-century Swiss women
Expatriate handball players
Swiss expatriate sportspeople in Germany